Pima is a town in Graham County, Arizona, United States. As of the 2010 census, the population of the town was 2,387, up from 1,989 in 2000. The estimated population in 2018 was 2,512. Pima is part of the Safford Micropolitan Statistical Area.

Despite its name, it is not located in nearby Pima County. This is a similar situation to the town of Maricopa, Arizona, which is not located in Maricopa County but rather in Pinal County.

History
Pima was settled by Mormon settlers in 1879. It was originally named "Smithville". The first settlers had been living in Forrest Dale, but then were told they had to leave because the location was on Indian land. Unlike other Mormon settlements of the era, Smithville was not planned by the leaders of the church.

Joseph K. Rogers was the first branch president at Pima, being appointed to this office before any of the settlers arrived. The branch was organized into a ward in 1880. In 1930 the ward had 666 members. Pima had a population of 980, and a total of 1,260 people resided within the boundaries of the Pima ward. In 1990 Pima had 1,725 residents.

In 1882 Jesse N. Smith predicted that a Mormon temple would one day be built in Pima. The Gila Valley Arizona Temple is currently at a site between Pima and Thatcher in Central, Arizona, within the boundaries of the Pima Arizona Stake of the Church.

Geography
Pima is located in central Graham County at  (32.888631, −109.828279), in the valley of the Gila River. U.S. Route 70 passes through the town, leading southeast  to Safford, the county seat, and northwest  to Globe.

Demographics

As of the census of 2000, there were 1,989 people, 663 households, and 521 families residing in the town. The racial makeup of the town was 87.0% White, 0.2% Black or African American, 0.8% Native American, 0.1% Asian, 9.9% from other races, and 2.1% from two or more races.  20.1% of the population were Hispanic or Latino of any race.

There were 663 households, out of which 42.5% had children under the age of 18 living with them, 63.3% were married couples living together, 10.6% had a female householder with no husband present, and 21.4% were non-families. 18.4% of all households were made up of individuals, and 10.3% had someone living alone who was 65 years of age or older.  The average household size was 3.00 and the average family size was 3.43.

In the town, the population was spread out, with 34.3% under the age of 18, 9.8% from 18 to 24, 23.4% from 25 to 44, 18.3% from 45 to 64, and 14.2% who were 65 years of age or older.  The median age was 30 years. For every 100 females, there were 97.3 males.  For every 100 females age 18 and over, there were 89.8 males.

The median income for a household in the town was $30,985, and the median income for a family was $34,900. Males had a median income of $31,765 versus $21,042 for females. The per capita income for the town was $12,896.  About 15.0% of families and 19.4% of the population were below the poverty line, including 25.3% of those under age 18 and 15.6% of those age 65 or over.

Gallery

Transportation
San Carlos Apache Nnee Bich'o Nii Transit provides transportation from Pima to the San Carlos Apache Indian Reservation, Safford and Globe.

See also
 The Church of Jesus Christ of Latter-day Saints in Arizona
 List of cities and towns in Arizona

References

External links
 Town of Pima official website

Populated places established in 1879
Towns in Graham County, Arizona
Arizona placenames of Native American origin
Safford, Arizona micropolitan area
1879 establishments in Arizona Territory